James O. Van Ostrand (born August 7, 1984) is a Canadian former professional baseball player and current Mental Skills Coach for the Toronto Blue Jays. Van Ostrand competed for the Canadian national baseball team in numerous international competitions and is now on the staff at the University of Arizona.

Career
Van Ostrand attended McMath Secondary School in Richmond, British Columbia. While in high school, Van Ostrand played for the North Delta Blue Jays of the British Columbia Premier Baseball League.  He was drafted by the Pittsburgh Pirates in the 29th round (855th overall) of the 2003 MLB draft, but did not sign, choosing to attend Allan Hancock College. Van Ostrand transferred to California Polytechnic State University, where he played for the Cal Poly Mustangs baseball team. He was selected by the Houston Astros in the eighth round (249th overall) of the 2006 MLB draft.

Van Ostrand played for the Tri-City ValleyCats of the New York–Penn League in 2006, leading the team to the New York–Penn League Finals. Van Ostrand was named to the South Atlantic League All-Star team while playing for the Lexington Legends in 2007. That year, he was also named to the All-Star Futures Game.  He was named to the Carolina League All-Star team while playing for the Salem Avalanche in 2008.  He was promoted to the Double-A Corpus Christi Hooks of the Texas League in 2008.  In 2012, he began playing for the Sugar Land Skeeters minor league team of the Atlantic League of Professional Baseball. On May 26, 2012, Van Ostrand signed with the Washington Nationals.

International career
Van Ostrand played for the Canadian national baseball team in the 2007 and 2009 Baseball World Cup, winning the bronze medal in 2009.  He also played for Team Canada in the 2008 Summer Olympics, finishing sixth, and the 2011 Pan American Games, where Canada won the gold medal. Van Ostrand drove in both of Canada's runs in the gold medal-clinching victory over the United States national baseball team.

Post playing career
In 2014, Van Ostrand started to volunteer coach for the Boston College Eagles. As of 2016, he was the Director of Player Development for the University of Arizona.

He currently works for the Toronto Blue Jays as the mental skills coach. He previously worked for the Seattle Mariners.

References

External links

MiLB.com player profile

1984 births
Living people
Allan Hancock Bulldogs baseball players
Arizona Wildcats baseball coaches
Baseball players at the 2011 Pan American Games
Baseball people from British Columbia
Boston College Eagles baseball coaches
Cal Poly Mustangs baseball players
Canadian baseball coaches
Canadian expatriate baseball players in the United States
Corpus Christi Hooks players
Harrisburg Senators players
Lexington Legends players
Pan American Games gold medalists for Canada
Pan American Games medalists in baseball
Salem Avalanche players
Sportspeople from Vancouver
Syracuse Chiefs players
Sugar Land Skeeters players
Tri-City Dust Devils players
World Baseball Classic players of Canada
2013 World Baseball Classic players
Medalists at the 2011 Pan American Games